Austre Bokn is an island in Bokn municipality in Rogaland county, Norway. The  island lies on the northern side of the Boknafjorden between the islands of Ognøya and Vestre Bokn. It's connected to the other two islands and to the mainland by a series of bridges along the European route E39 highway.

Most of the island is barren, rocky, and uninhabited. The majority of the island's population is located along the western and southern shores. With less than 200 residents on the island, it is the second most populous island in the municipality (only 3 islands in Bokn are populated).

See also
List of islands of Norway

References

Islands of Rogaland
Bokn